Thomas E. Jackson Jr. (born August 24, 1949) is an American politician. He is a member of the Alabama House of Representatives from the 68th District, serving since 1994. He is a member of the Democratic party.

References

Living people
Democratic Party members of the Alabama House of Representatives
1949 births
21st-century American politicians